B. maculata may refer to:

 Badumna maculata, an intertidal spider
 Balionycteris maculata, a Southeast Asian megabat
 Bambusa maculata, an evergreen plant
 Barygenys maculata, a frog endemic to Papua New Guinea
 Bathyraja maculata, a Pacific skate
 Begonia maculata, a plant native to Brazil
 Belone maculata, a marine fish
 Belonogaster maculata, a quasisocial wasp
 Bertolonia maculata, a plant native to South America
 Bicalcasura maculata, a Dominican weevil
 Biceropsis maculata, a daddy longlegs
 Blackburnia maculata, a ground beetle
 Boiruna maculata, a colubrid snake
 Boulengerella maculata, a South American pike-characin
 Brachichila maculata, a ground beetle
 Brahmaea maculata, an African moth
 Brassia maculata, a North American orchid
 Brownleea maculata, a plant native to Africa
 Burlingtonia maculata, an orchid endemic to Brazil